Hanna Dresner-Tzakh (born 17 September 1947), better known by her stage name Ilanit, is an Israeli singer. She was one of Israel's most popular singers from the late 1960s to the 1980s, both as a soloist and in the duo Ilan ve-Ilanit. 
Ilanit also represented Israel twice in the Eurovision Song Contest. In a career spanning over 4 decades, Ilanit recorded and produced over 600 songs and more than 30 best-selling albums.

Biography
Hanna Dresner (later Ilanit)  was born in Tel Aviv after her parents immigrated from Poland. In 1953, at the age of 5, the family moved to Brazil where they joined a number of South American acts. In 1960, at the age of 13, Ilanit moved back to Israel. In 1962 Ilanit was discovered in a youth talent contest organized by WIZO and the magazine Ma'ariv Youth.

Singing career

Shlomo Zach, an Israeli singer whom she later married, formed a trio that was later known as "גידי, צח וחנה" (Gidi, Zach, and Hanna). The trio became a duo, renamed "Ilan & Ilanit". In 1966 the duo's first album was produced, named "Ilan Ilan". Two of their songs, "לכל אדם כוכב" (A star for everyone) and "בואי סניורינה''" (Come, Miss) became hits topping the music charts. The duo became a big success during the 60s in Israel and abroad. Their 1970 hit "Veshuv Itchem" ("With You Again" in Hebrew) was covered by Turkish singer Şenay as "Sev Kardeşim" ("Love my brother/sister" in Turkish) in 1971. Şenay became famous with singing this cover.

In 1968 Ilanit released her first solo song, "כבר אחרי חצות" (kvar acharei chatzot / "It's After Midnight"). The record came with the song, "בוא ונשתגע בחולות" (bo ve-nishtage'ah ba-cholot / "Let's Go Crazy in the Sands") by Ilan & Ilanit. Her first solo performance took place in the 1969 Israeli Song Festival where she sang "שיר בארבעה בתים" (shir b'arbaah batim / "Song in Four Verses"). While she did not win the competition, the song itself became a big success.

In 1973, she first took part in the 1973 Eurovision Song Contest in Luxembourg where she reached the fourth position with the song "Ey Sham" ("Somewhere"). This was also the first ever participation of Israel in the Song Contest. The song was composed by Nurit Hirsh, who also conducted the orchestra in Luxembourg on that occasion. It was only the second time that the orchestra was conducted by a woman; the first time was on that very evening (Monica Dominique, "You're Summer", Sweden).

The second participation by Ilanit was in London in 1977 with a song entitled "Ahava Hi Shir Lishnayim" ("Love is a Song for Two"). With this song she came eleventh. Ilanit was going to try to represent Israel in the Eurovision for a third time, at the 1984 Eurovision Song Contest. But Israel cancelled its participation in the contest that year due to a conflict with its Memorial Day. Rather than wait a year for the next contest, Ilanit decided to release the song she was going to compete with, "Balalaika" in 1984. At that time Ilanit was already one of Israel's most popular singers and the song "Balalaika" became an instant hit, despite not being a Eurovision song entry representing Israel.

Ilanit was named Israel's top female singer every year from 1971 to 1977, something no other singer has achieved. 

In 1974 Ilanit represented Israel at the World Popular Song Festival In Tokyo '74 with the song "Shiru Shir Lashemesh" ("Sing A Song to the Sun"). The final was held on 17 November and she came ninth.

Together with other established Israeli artists she took part in a tour through North America in 2005. After "Brazilian Dream," released in 1996, she didn't record a new album for 12 years. In 2008, she emerged released the album "Israelit." She continues to perform occasionally at special events, for example, the Hadassah centennial in October 2012. She also appeared at the opening of the Grand Final of the 2019 Eurovision Song Contest where she performed the chorus of "Ey-Sham."

See also
Music of Israel

References

External links 

 Ilanit interview from Ynetnews

1947 births
Living people
20th-century Israeli women singers
Eurovision Song Contest entrants for Israel
Eurovision Song Contest entrants of 1973
Eurovision Song Contest entrants of 1977
People from Tel Aviv
Thelma Yellin High School of Arts alumni
Israeli people of Polish-Jewish descent